is a railway station operated by Kobe New Transit in Chūō-ku, Kobe, Japan. It is on the Port Island Line. The station serves the passenger terminal of the Port of Kobe, which is used by international ferry lines and cruise ships.

Ridership

Adjacent stations

References

External links
  

Railway stations in Japan opened in 1981
Railway stations in Kobe